The San Bernardino Pioneers were a minor league baseball team, that played in the Sunset League from 1947 to 1950.

They originated as the Anaheim Valencias and were located in Anaheim, California. On June 25, 1948, they moved to San Bernardino, California and the following season became the Pioneers. Baseball would not return to Anaheim until the California Angels of Major League Baseball moved there in 1966.

External links
Baseball Reference Anaheim
Baseball Reference San Bernardino

Baseball teams established in 1948
Sports clubs disestablished in 1950
Defunct Sunset League teams
Professional baseball teams in California
Sports in San Bernardino, California
Sports in the Inland Empire
Defunct baseball teams in California
1948 establishments in California
1950 disestablishments in California
Baseball teams disestablished in 1950